Tadhana is a Philippine television drama anthology show broadcast by GMA Network. Hosted by Marian Rivera, it premiered on May 20, 2017 on the network's Sabado Star Power line up replacing Karelasyon.

The series is streaming online on YouTube.

Premise

Featuring a story of an overseas Filipino worker's struggles and sacrifices to work in a foreign land, and face separation and being homesick across the world in the hope of the loved ones' better future.

Production
In March 2019, Dingdong Dantes served as substitute host of the show, after Marian Rivera went to parental leave due to her pregnancy. In March 2020, principal photography was halted due to the enhanced community quarantine in Luzon caused by the COVID-19 pandemic. Filming was continued in September 2020. The show resumed its programming on October 3, 2020.

Ratings
According to AGB Nielsen Philippines' Nationwide Urban Television Audience Measurement People in television homes, the pilot episode of Tadhana earned a 6.9% rating.

Accolades

References

External links
 
 

2017 Philippine television series debuts
Filipino-language television shows
GMA Network original programming
GMA Integrated News and Public Affairs shows
Philippine anthology television series
Television productions suspended due to the COVID-19 pandemic